John Hungerford Pollen may refer to:

 John Hungerford Pollen (1820–1902), English writer on crafts  and furniture
 John Hungerford Pollen (1858–1925), English Jesuit, known as a historian of the Protestant Reformation